Hold Me Down is the second studio album by English rock band You Me at Six, released on 11 January 2010 through Virgin Records as the follow-up to 2008's Take Off Your Colours. It is the band's first release on the major label Virgin Records. Like their debut album, the album was once again produced and engineered by John Mitchell and Matt O'Grady. "The Consequence" was made available for free digital download before the first single, "Underdog" preceded the album's release. Despite receiving mixed reviews, Hold Me Down was a commercial success and debuted at No. 5 on the UK Albums Chart and is certified Gold in the UK for 100,000 shipments of copies.

Background and production
You Me at Six's debut album Take Off Your Colours was released in October 2008, produced by Matt O'Grady and John Mitchell. To promote the album, the band sold out the Astoria and the Roundhouse, both in London. They later supported Fall Out Boy and Paramore separately on their Europe tours. Sometime after this, frontman Josh Franceschi broke up with his long-term girlfriend, which to him was the "biggest thing in the world". In April and May 2009, the band recorded the majority of their next album, with additional sessions in July 2009. Mitchell and O'Grady returned to produce the group's next album. O'Grady also acted as engineer, while Mitchell mixed the recordings. Bob Ludwig mastered the album at Gateway Mastering. Franceschi said the band made an album that "sounded really big on [a] CD". He also stated that recording took around 6–7 weeks, as opposed to the 2 weeks for Take Off Your Colours. The album also features guest vocals from Aled Phillips of Kids in Glass Houses on "There's No Such Thing as Accidental Infidelity" and Sean Smith of The Blackout on "The Consequence". Prior to release the band stated they were very happy that the album "reflects our growth as people and musicians".

Composition
Musically, the album has been described as pop punk and pop rock. According to Franceschi, the band "developed our sound a lot" and built upon all of the "things we thought were good from Take Off Your Colours". They spent more time writing material, which Franceschi said was "really important, the album like forming the way it did. I think it’s definitely a step in the right direction for our band". Before working on the album, he had broken up with his girlfriend and wanted to avoid writing about that situation. Instead, he focused on the previous year of his life and problems that he had with the music industry.

"The Consequence" is darker-edged track that opens the album with sound of sirens; the guitar riff in it recalled the one in "Everyday Combat" by Lostprophets. Franceschi's vocal on it had been compared to Silverchair frontman Daniel Johns. "Underdog" with its focus on drums and guitars earned it a comparison to "Disloyal Order of Water Buffaloes" (2008) by Fall Out Boy. "Playing the Blame Game" evokes the sound of Paramore and Panic! at the Disco. Portions of "Stay with Me" were reminiscent of the work of the Used. "There's No Such Thing as Accidental Infidelity" is a soft rock song that incorporated the band's American influences. The album concludes with the pop rock track "Fireworks".

Release and promotion
On 11 November 2009, Hold Me Down was announced for release in January 2010. In addition, the album's track listing was revealed. On 25 November, "The Consequence" was released as a free download. In December, the group supported Paramore on their headlining UK tour. "Underdog" premiered on Nick Grimshaw's BBC Radio 1 show on 17 December. The following day, a music video was released for "The Consequence". "Underdog" was posted on the band's Myspace page on 27 December. A music video was released for the track on 4 January 2010. Hold Me Down was released on 11 January through Virgin Records. "Underdog" was released as a single, with "Fact-Tastic" and an acoustic version of "Underdog" as additional tracks, on 5 February. In February and March, the band performed at the Soundwave festival in Australia, and then embarked on a headlining UK tour. In the midst of this, a music video was released for "Underdog". On 16 March, the album was released in the US.

A music video was released for "Liquid Confidence" on 19 March. The track was released as an EP, with live versions of "The Consequence" and "Kiss and Tell" recorded at Wembley Arena as additional tracks, on 16 April. In May, the band performed at BBC Radio 1's Big Weekend. The group supported Bring Me the Horizon for two shows in the US, before embarking on the Warped Tour between late June and early August. A music video was released for "Stay with Me" on 21 July. In August, the band performed on the main stage at the Reading and Leeds Festivals. "Stay with Me" was released as a single, with a cover of Ellie Goulding's "Starry Eyed" and an acoustic version of "Stay with Me" as additional tracks, on 3 September. The band then went on tours of New Zealand, Australia and Japan. In December, the group went on a headlining UK tour with support from The Blackout, Set Your Goals and Canterbury. Due to weather issues, two of shows were rescheduled for January 2011. The group then added two extra shows around these rescheduled date.

In 2021, Franceschi ranked Hold Me Down as his fourth favourite You Me at Six album, stating that it felt as if it was "our first ‘real’ recording of an album. By that I mean we had a longer time to put the record together". That same year, the band played a series of celebratory 10th anniversary shows where they performed the album in its entirety.

Reception

After selling over 10,000 copies, the album reached number four in the midweek chart, before eventually charting at number five in the UK chart. It was certified Silver by the British Phonographic Industry in March 2010 and Gold in March 2012. It had sold over 60,000 copies by May 2011. "Liquid Confidence" and Hold Me Down were nominated at the 2010 Kerrang! Awards for Best Single and Best Album respectively. Out of the two, "Liquid Confidence" won Best Single.

Hold Me Down received mixed reviews from music critics upon its release, ranging from high praise to criticism in equal measure. AnyDecentMusic? gave it an average score of 4.6, based on eight reviews. Tim Newbound reviewed the album in Rock Sound and was largely favorable. He made comparisons with New Found Glory's self-titled album; "the album boasts a glorious sense of youthful exuberance, arguably only bettered by their US peers New Found Glory's 2000 self-titled effort... These boys are far from copycats though. There are way too many melodic rock/pop-punk bands in the world who are happy to ride on the coattails of others; throughout Hold Me Down, You Me at Six have instead pushed themselves to create a record that will delight existing fans and should rightfully attract many more". Kerrang! magazine were also favourable. David McLaughlin stated that "this time around You Me at Six have spiked the mix and created a cocktail so sweetly addictive that the faithful might just have to get used to sharing this band with many more". He also complimented the band's progression by adding, "It's not so much that the songs themselves that impress, but rather how much it shows this band are growing".

Joe Barton of The Skinny was less favourable however. He lamented, "any of the dozen tracks of Hold Me Down, despite being flawlessly executed, could just as easily have been knocked out by teen-adored Hoobastank or Taking Back Sunday. That being said, this kind of music has a rabid audience. If they’d only been a few years older, though, they would have the Arctic Monkeys to idolise... you can’t help feeling these kids have been short-changed". More unfavorable reviews also followed from British newspapers; Simon Price of The Independent bemoaned, "From the action-packed band name to the obligatory long song titles, from the witless blare of the vocals to the compressed blandness of the guitar sound, this is bog-standard emo ordinaire". Kitty Empire of The Observer criticized the album's lack of originality; "Polished, punchy Hold Me Down is their second album, replete with bouncy dramas about loyalty, betrayal and other perils of young love. Its sole insight is contained in the song title 'There's No Such Thing As Accidental Infidelity'; not even the most fine-meshed musical sieve could unearth any originality here".

BBC critic Raziq Rauf gave a mixed review, but was ultimately disappointed with Hold Me Down. He summarised his article by stating the album was, "simply a carefully polished and highly competent, nearly retrospective collection of pop-rock songs from a band that, even at a young age, has nothing to say that hasn't been said by others before them (and, unarguably, said better). As 'Fireworks' closes the album, Franceschi moans about a girl who blew her chance; you can’t help but think You Me At Six, in such a privileged position, have done the same". Davey Boy of Sputnikmusic was more favorable. Despite criticizing an "Americanised" sound, the review offered praise to the band's progression; "Josh Franceschi’s vocals have clearly improved from the occasionally whiny attributes of his past, while the music on show has a much fuller sound. Thankfully, the better songs still have a multitude of hooks to keep you singing along and there is nothing downright awful included. It is just hoped that next time around, these strengths can be coupled with greater imagination and ambition". Arwa Haider of Metro stated that while the band have "stuck to a formula", she praised the "assured performances". She wrote, "Admittedly, their angry outbursts (Safer To Hate Her) and cod-American drawling stick to a well-worn formula but it’s one spiced up with ample punch, pop and prettiness".

Ben Brady, journalist for In the News complimented the album's direction; "Debut offering Take Off Your Colours was a good album, with pieces of great, however tracks swayed between pop punk and rock and to listen to the LP in full it didn't always have a clear direction. With their second full studio effort, that direction has been discovered as the heavier elements start to show through, while maintaining the catchy crowd pleasing sing alongs; as an example, the slightly predictable nature of first single 'Underdog' demonstrates there is something here for everyone". Niki Boyle of The List was also more favourable, stating: "Chances are, if you liked YMA6’s first effort Take Off Your Colours, you’ll find plenty to like here. Spiky pop-punk riffs, catchy choruses and guest vocalists from The Blackout and Kids in Glass Houses ensure there’s nothing to disappoint the fans".

Track listing
All music by You Me at Six, all lyrics by Josh Franceschi.

Personnel
Personnel per booklet.

You Me at Six
Josh Franceschi – vocals
Chris Miller – lead guitar
Max Helyer – rhythm guitar
Matt Barnes – bass guitar
Dan Flint – drums

Additional musicians
Sean Smith – guest vocals (track 1)
Aled Phillips – guest vocals (track 10)

Production
John Mitchell – producer, mixing
Matty O'Grady – producer, engineer
Bob Ludwig – mastering
Simon Helm – angel painting

Charts

Weekly charts

Year-end charts

Certifications

References

External links

Hold Me Down at YouTube (streamed copy where licensed)
 Interview at Review Rinse Repeat

2010 albums
You Me at Six albums
Virgin Records albums